Santosh Yadav (born 17 October 1979) is an Indian former cricketer. He played ten first-class matches for Hyderabad between 1995 and 2007.

See also
 List of Hyderabad cricketers

References

External links
 

1979 births
Living people
Indian cricketers
Hyderabad cricketers
Cricketers from Hyderabad, India